P. frontalis may refer to:
 Paguristes frontalis, a hermit crab species
 Pericoptus frontalis, a beetle species
 Phoenicurus frontalis, the blue-fronted redstart, a bird species found in Bhutan, China and India
 Pipreola frontalis, the scarlet-breasted fruiteater, a bird species found in Bolivia and Ecuador
 Plebeia frontalis, a stingless bee species in the genus Plebeia
 Pyrrhura frontalis, the reddish-bellied parakeet, a small parrot species found from southeastern Brazil to north-eastern Argentina

See also
 Frontalis (disambiguation)